Kershner is a surname. Notable people with the surname include:

 Bruce Kershner, forest ecologist
 Irvin Kershner, American film director
 Isabel Kershner, British journalist
 Jason Kershner, pitcher for the Seattle Mariners
 Shannon Kershner, Presbyterian pastor
 Ted Kershner, American football coach at Glassboro State University